The 2010 Dutch Figure Skating Championships took place between 19 and 20 December 2009 in Eindhoven. Skaters competed in the disciplines of men's singles, ladies' singles, pair skating, and synchronized skating across the levels of senior, junior, novice, and the pre-novice level debs.

Senior results

Men

Ladies

Junior results

Men

Ladies

Pairs

Synchronized

Novice results

Men

Ladies

Debs results

Men

Ladies

External links
 2010 Dutch Championships results

Dutch Figure Skating Championships
Dutch Figure Skating Championships, 2010
2009 in figure skating
2010 in Dutch sport